Eje Elgh (born 15 June 1953) is a Swedish racing driver and television reporter. He currently works as an expert commentator for Formula One in Sweden together with Janne Blomqvist. The two have worked together as Formula One commentators for a long time, first for TV4 and then for Viasat Motor when they took over the Formula One broadcasting in Sweden.

When he could get no further in Europe, Elgh tried his luck as a driver in Japan, racing both in Japanese Formula 2 / Formula 3000 and the Japanese Sports-Prototype Championship during its heyday in 1984–1988 and focusing on the latter from 1989, first with Team Schuppan Porsche 962, then with Tom's Toyota's 91CV/92CV.

Career
In the 1970s, Elgh tried the classical way through the single-seater formulas from the Formula Super Vee towards Formula One. In the late 1970s he was regarded in Sweden as a great talent and was seen by Swedish motorsport journalists as a successor to the recently deceased Gunnar Nilsson and Ronnie Peterson. He was managed in the 1970s and 1980s by former racing driver Torsten Palm.

After the Formula Super Vee Elgh came to England to race in the 1977 British Formula 3 Championships. Because most Formula 1 teams had their factories in England and because of the large concentration of talented drivers  the British championship was regarded a stepping stone to Formula 1. During the 1977 season the Swede raced for the Chevron Racing Team. He finished joint second in the BP Super Visco British F3 series and joint 5th in the Vandervell British F3 series.

By 1978, Elgh had stepped up to Formula 2 and went to Fred Opert Racing team at the start. The first season was quite successful for a rookie. In Pau he was within second to Bruno Giacomelli and finished the races at Rouen-les-Essarts and Hockenheim in sixth. In the final standings of the championship he was 11th.

In 1979, he moved to Tiga Race Cars, winning his first F2 race at Enna-Pergusa. However, his best year in the Formula 2 Championship was the 1981 season. The year before he went to MM Mampe Team and had a disastrous first season, finishing only one race, in 9th. In 1981 he won in Vallelunga and finished second at Thruxton (behind team-mate Roberto Guerrero) and at the Nordschleife of Nürburgring (behind Thierry Boutsen) and third at Spa. He took 3rd in the championship that year.

Despite these successes and a test drive for McLaren he was not able to advance to the Formula 1 World Championship, so he sought new challenges in Asia. In the early 1980s many European racers changed the Japanese motorsport scene. Elgh successfully drove there in the Japanese Formula 2 and Formula 3000 Championships and in the Japanese Endurance and Sports-Prototype Championships.

In mid 80s Elgh began touring and sports car career. He was works driver with Dome Motorsport and drove 1984 European Touring Car Championship races for the Volvo team of his compatriot Robert Kvist. Together with Ulf Granberg he was second in the 500 km race at Mugello.

By the end of his career in 1995 he was closely associated with Domes and the sports car team of Toyota for which he was engaged almost continuously. Elgh was regarded as a strong development driver and a loyal team player who was at Toyota also at times when success eluded the team. He won his first long distance race in 1985 with partner Geoff Lees at the 500-km race at Suzuka, a round of All Japan Sports Prototype Championship in a Dome 84C. His last of four successes in the Japanese Sports Car Championship was the overall win in the 500-km race from Sugo in 1991, again with Lees as a partner, this time in the Toyota 91C-V.

In 2006 he shared a Motortecnica MAN 4x4 truck with Paolo Barilla and Matteo Marzotto in the Dakar rally.

He also participated in the 2009 Dakar Rally where he was involved in a frightening crash. His Nissan Patrol GR Y61 fell down a 100-meter cliff and was completely destroyed, but Elgh and partner Paolo Barilla survived without any serious injuries.

In recent years he has competed in the Monaco Historique GP, in 2012 in a 1977 F3 Chevron B38-Toyota, the same car as he drove in British F3 in 1977. He was back in 2016 behind the wheel of a 1971 March 711-Cosworth Formula 1 car.

Racing record

Career highlights

Complete European Formula Two Championship results
(key) (Races in bold indicate pole position; races in italics indicate fastest lap)

24 Hours of Le Mans results

Daytona 24 Hours results

References 

Formula One journalists and reporters
Motorsport agents
Swedish racing drivers
Swedish television personalities
1953 births
Living people
Swedish expatriate sportspeople in Japan
Swedish expatriates in England
24 Hours of Le Mans drivers
World Sportscar Championship drivers
Japanese Sportscar Championship drivers
Long Distance Series drivers
Grand Champion Series drivers
European Formula Two Championship drivers
Japanese Formula Two Championship drivers
Japanese Formula 3000 Championship drivers
FIA European Formula 3 Championship drivers
British Formula Three Championship drivers
Formel Super Vau drivers
Canadian Formula Atlantic Championship drivers
New Zealand Formula Pacific Championship drivers
European Touring Car Championship drivers
Japanese Touring Car Championship drivers
24 Hours of Daytona drivers
Swedish Formula Three Championship drivers
TOM'S drivers